The Willow River is a river in Oneida County, Wisconsin, that merges with the Tomahawk River by way of the Willow Flowage.  Historically the Willow River was a significant white pine logging region.

References

External links

Rivers of Wisconsin
Rivers of Oneida County, Wisconsin